Les Ferreries de Calvera or Las Herrerías is a locality located in the municipality of Beranuy, in Huesca province, Aragon, Spain. As of 2020, it has a population of 11.

Geography 
Les Ferreries de Calvera is located 125km east-northeast of Huesca.

References

Populated places in the Province of Huesca